Voyeur, also known as , is a Japanese manga series written and illustrated by Hideo Yamamoto. The series and its sequel  were serialized in the manga magazine Weekly Young Sunday from 1992 to 1997. The series broadly focuses on individuals who engage in voyeurism for both sexual gratification and investigative purposes. Voyeurs, Inc. has been adapted twice: as a live-action film produced by Toei in 1995, and as a live-action television drama produced by TV Tokyo in 2007. In North America, an English-language translation of Voyeur and the first three volumes of Voyeurs, Inc. were published by Viz Media, which also serialized the series in its manga magazine Pulp.

Synopsis

Voyeur
Ko, a young man visiting a parking lot popular for hookups with his girlfriend Satomi, confronts Takuro, a peeping tom spying on couples using a night-vision device. Takuro states that his voyeurism allows him to see a person's true nature, and mocks Ko for "hiding behind his smile". The encounter stokes paranoia in the otherwise cheerful Ko, who becomes convinced that Satomi is unfaithful to him. Ko begins to observe Satomi with Takuro, and they ultimately discover her having sex with another man. Ko discloses to Takuro that as a child, he adopted a personality of forced kindness as a coping mechanism to deal with his trust issues, after a friend murdered his pet dog in jealousy when Ko was selected over him to participate in a karate competition. Ko and Takuro jointly establish "Voyeurs, Inc.", a security and private investigation company.

Voyeurs, Inc.
Voyeurs, Inc. transplants the concept of a voyeuristic private investigation company to a new cast of characters: veteran investigator Ken, his associate Cho, and their novice apprentice Smile. They are later joined by Reika Takamizawa, a student who was initially the subject of one of Voyeurs, Inc.'s investigations. The series follows the group as they are hired by clients to investigate various individuals.

Characters
  
 
 The head of Voyeurs, Inc., and an expert wiretapper and lockpicker. He has a cataract in his left eye – which he claims can read people's minds – for which he wears a thick contact lens.

 
 
 A brilliant and cunning student who secretly operates a prostitution ring. She is initially investigated by Voyeurs, Inc. at the behest of her father, but later joins the group.

 
 
 An investigator at Voyeurs, Inc. with a heightened sense of hearing.

 
 
 A hot-headed apprentice at Voyeurs, Inc. who seeks to be an investigator.

 
 A pet dog kept by the group.

Media

Manga
Voyeur was serialized in the manga magazine Weekly Young Sunday in 1992, while its sequel Voyeurs, Inc. was serialized in Weekly Young Sunday from 1993 to 1997. The series was written and illustrated by Hideo Yamamoto, who stated that he wished to use the series to depict "the spiritual crisis of the modern era", and "people's longing for a sense of security".

In Japan, the series was collected into 12 collected tankōbon volumes published by Shogakukan. In North America, an English-language translation of Voyeur and the first three volumes of Voyeurs, Inc. were published by Viz Media, which also serialized the series in its manga magazine Pulp. Pulp simultaneously serialized Voyeurs, Inc. and Short Cuts by Usamaru Furuya, both of which include prostitution as subject material; as such, it published "Vulgarity Drifting Diary", a column by sex worker Hikaru Natsumi, to provide an alternate perspective on the issue.

Live-action film
In 1995, Voyeurs, Inc was adapted into a live action film by Toei under the title Nozokiya. The film was directed by Tadafumi Tomioka and starred  as Ken, Asaka Seto as Reika, Takanori Jinnai as Cho, and Jun Murakami as Smile.

Television drama
In 2007, Voyeurs, Inc was adapted into a live-action television drama that aired on TV Tokyo under the title Nozokiya. The series was directed by Kiyoshi Yamamoto and written by Yasutoshi Murakawa, and aired from April 2 to July 2, 2007.

Reception
In his review of Voyeur for the American manga magazine Manga Max, Lee Brimmicombe-Wood described the series as "disturbing and provocative", and "a brave strip for Viz to publish". Christopher Kinsey of Anime Outsiders praised the series' writing and art style, noting that the style of the latter "gives you a breather from the rather weighty" subject material of the series.

Notes

References

External links
 Official television drama website at TV Tokyo
 
 

1992 manga
Seinen manga
Shogakukan manga
Viz Media manga
Live-action films based on manga
Manga adapted into films
Japanese television dramas based on manga
Japanese drama television series
TV Tokyo original programming